The electoral district of Evelyn is an electorate of the Victorian Legislative Assembly covering the urban fringe north east of Melbourne. It was first proclaimed in 1859.

The seat has shrunk considerably in size as the eastern suburbs of Melbourne grew. It now includes the suburbs and towns of Coldstream, Gruyere, Lilydale, and Wonga Park.

The seat is usually safe for the Liberal Party but it was won by the Labor Party during their three landslide victories of 1952, 1982 and 2002.

At the 2006 election Christine Fyffe regained the seat for the Liberals, defeating Heather McTaggart. Fyffe was re-elected to the district during at the 2010 and 2014 Victorian state elections.

Members

Election results

Graphical summary

Historical maps

External links
 Electorate profile: Evelyn, Victorian Electoral Commission

References

Electoral districts of Victoria (Australia)
1859 establishments in Australia
Yarra Ranges